The 2012 European Figure Skating Championships was an international figure skating competition in the 2011–12 season. The event determined the European Champions in men's singles, ladies singles, pair skating, and ice dancing. The competition was held from 23 to 29 January 2012 in Sheffield, Great Britain.

Qualification
Skaters were eligible for the event if they were representing a European member nations of the International Skating Union and had reached the age of 15 before 1 July 2011 in their place of birth. The corresponding competition for non-European skaters was the 2012 Four Continents Championships. National associations selected their entries according to their own criteria but the ISU mandated that their selections achieve a minimum technical elements score (TES) at an international event prior to the European Championships.

Minimum TES

Number of entries per discipline
Based on the results of the 2011 European Championships, the ISU allowed each country one to three entries per discipline.

Entries
Some skaters were required to compete in a preliminary round, while others received a direct entry into the short program, after which the number of entries might be reduced further. If a country had a non-direct entry, its lowest-ranked skater according to the Worlds Standings competed in the preliminary round.

Member states submitted the following entries:

In January 2012, the ISU released a statement confirming that Evgeni Plushenko, who did not have a minimum score from the current or previous season, had been allowed to participate in the competition.

Schedule
(Local time, UTC/GMT):

 Monday 23 January
 15:00–18:05 – Preliminary round: Ice dancing
 18:30–21:35 – Preliminary round: Men
 Tuesday 24 January
 14:00–17:45 – Preliminary round: Ladies
 Wednesday 25 January
 14:00–16:55 – Pairs' short
 17:45–18:00 – Opening ceremony
 18:30–21:25 – Short dance
 Thursday 26 January
 13:00–17:10 – Men's short
 18:30–21:30 – Pairs' free
 Friday 27 January
 13:00–17:10 – Ladies' short
 18:00–21:20 – Free dance
 Saturday 28 January
 11:55–16:00 – Men's free
 17:30–21:25 – Ladies' free
 Sunday 29 January
 13:30–16:00 – Exhibitions

Overview
2012 was the first time in more than twenty years that Great Britain organized the European Championships. Robin Cousins choreographed the opening ceremony featuring 100 young local skaters and attended by Prince Edward.

Evgeni Plushenko won the preliminary round. The top 11 skaters advanced from the preliminary round to the short program, joining 17 direct entries. Jason Thompson who placed 13th also advanced as the representative of the host country. Artur Gachinski narrowly won the short program ahead of Plushenko. Plushenko won the free skate and took his seventh European title, while Gachinski took the silver and France's Florent Amodio won the bronze.

23 ladies competed in the preliminary round, with the top ten advancing to the short program to join 18 direct entries. Polina Korobeynikova was the winner of the preliminary round. The top three in the short program were Carolina Kostner, Kiira Korpi and Ksenia Makarova. In the free skate, Kostner placed first, followed by Korobeynikova, and Elene Gedevanishvili. Kostner won her fourth European title. Kiira Korpi took silver, her third European medal, and Gedevanishvili won her second bronze.

Russia's Yuko Kavaguti / Alexander Smirnov withdrew as a result of an emergency surgery the previous week to remove Smirnov's appendix and Ksenia Stolbova / Fedor Klimov took their place. No preliminary round was held because there were only 19 teams in total. Germany's Aliona Savchenko / Robin Szolkowy withdrew before the short program due to injury. Russia's Tatiana Volosozhar / Maxim Trankov won the short. Germany's Mari Vartmann / Daniel Wende collided with each other while attempting to avoid a French couple during the morning practice before the long programs on 26 January. Volosozhar / Trankov won the free skate to take their first European title, while Vera Bazarova / Yuri Larionov and Stolbova / Klimov took silver and bronze respectively for a Russian sweep of the podium.

19 teams competed in the ice dancing preliminary round, with the top eight advancing to the short dance to join 12 direct entries. Julia Zlobina / Alexei Sitnikov were first in the preliminary round. Ekaterina Bobrova / Dmitri Soloviev, Nathalie Pechalat / Fabian Bourzat, and Ekaterina Riazanova / Ilia Tkachenko were the top three in the short dance. Pechalat / Bourzat won the free dance to take their second European title, Bobrova / Soloviev repeated as silver medalists, and Elena Ilinykh / Nikita Katsalapov won bronze, their first time on the podium.

Results

Men

Ladies

Pairs

Ice dancing

Medals summary

Medals by country
Table of medals for overall placement:

Table of small medals for placement in the short segment:

Table of small medals for placement in the free segment:

Medalists
Medals for overall placement:

Small medals for placement in the short segment:

Small medals for placement in the free segment:

References

External links

 
 Entries at the International Skating Union
 Start order and results

European Figure Skating Championships
European
European Figure Skating Championships
Sports competitions in Sheffield
International figure skating competitions hosted by the United Kingdom
2010s in Sheffield
January 2011 sports events in the United Kingdom